The slate-coloured grosbeak (Saltator grossus) is a species of grosbeak in the family Thraupidae. Most of its range is the Amazon in South America, but it is also found in forests of the Chocó in Ecuador and Colombia, and southern Central America from Panama to Honduras.

Taxonomy
In 1760 the French zoologist Mathurin Jacques Brisson included a description of the slate-coloured grosbeak in the supplement to his Ornithologie based on a specimen collected in "America". He used the French name Le gros-bec bleu d'Amérique and the Latin name Coccothraustes americana caerulea. Although Brisson coined Latin names, these do not conform to the binomial system and are not recognised by the International Commission on Zoological Nomenclature. When in 1766 the Swedish naturalist Carl Linnaeus updated his Systema Naturae for the twelfth edition he added 240 species that had been previously described by Brisson in his Ornithologie. One of these was the slate-coloured grosbeak. Linnaeus included a terse description, coined the binomial name Loxia grossa and cited Brisson's work. The specific name grossa, grossus is Latin for "thick", "rough" or "coarse". The type locality has been restricted to French Guiana. This species is now placed in the genus Saltator that was introduced by the French ornithologist Louis Pierre Vieillot in 1816.

References

slate-coloured grosbeak
Birds of Nicaragua
Birds of Costa Rica
Birds of Panama
Birds of the Tumbes-Chocó-Magdalena
Birds of the Amazon Basin
Birds of the Guianas
slate-coloured grosbeak
slate-coloured grosbeak
Taxonomy articles created by Polbot